Pelee may refer to:
Pelee, Ontario, an island in Lake Erie, Canada
Point Pelee National Park, a park in Ontario, Canada
Mount Pelée, a volcano in Martinique
Peleus, who may be referred to as "Pélée" in French, father of Achilles

See also

Pele (disambiguation)